Las Lomas is a corregimiento in David District, Chiriquí Province, Panama. Its population as of 1990 was 10,615; its population as of 2000 was 13,683.

References

Corregimientos of Chiriquí Province